or "New Tokyo" is a common name for a fictional futuristic version of Tokyo often depicted in manga, anime, and video games.  An early example was the 1982 manga Akira, which was also adapted into a 1988 anime film.

Other Anime and manga
 Neo Tokyo (film), a 1987 science fiction anthology anime film
 Neo Tokyo, the name of the city in the 1983 manga Mirai Keisatsu Urashiman

Video games
 NeoTokyo (video game), a 2009 Half-Life 2 first-person shooter modification
 NeoTokyo, a setting from the 1997 first-person shooter Helicops
 NeoTokyo, a setting from the 1996 fighting arcade game Last Bronx
 Neo Tokyo, a territory in the 2001 game Risk 2210 A.D.
 Neo Tokyo, a field in the 2015 soccer game Rocket League
 Neo Tokyo, level in the 2002 first-person shooter TimeSplitters 2
 Neo Tokio, a city in the 1995 role playing game Terranigma

Other uses
 "Neotokyo", a 2015 single by The Algorithm
 "Neo Tokyo", a song on the 2016 album The Uncanny Valley by Perturbator
 "Neo Tokyo", a 2020 single featured on the 2021 album Nocturnal Party Music by Joshua Morata
 NeoTokyo, the name of a megalopolis in the 2012 card game Android: Netrunner
 Dreams of Neo-Tokyo, a 2017 album by Scandroid

See also
 Neo-Tōkyō Plan, a futuristic Tokyo project from the Metabolism movement
 Tokyo-3, a city from the 1995 anime Neon Genesis Evangelion
 New New York (disambiguation), several futuristic New York topics
 NT (disambiguation)

Fictional populated places in Japan